The Big League World Series was a baseball tournament for youth aged 15 to 18 years old that began in 1968. On August 26, 2016, Little League International announced that it was eliminating the Big League Level of both baseball and softball. It was patterned after the Little League World Series, which was named for the World Series in Major League Baseball. Most recently, the tournament was held in Easley, South Carolina.

The Big League World Series was held at four different sites.
Winston-Salem, North Carolina 1968–1969
Fort Lauderdale, Florida 1970–1998
Tucson, Arizona 1999–2000
Easley, South Carolina 2001–2016

Tournament format

Pool A (U.S.) consisted of six regions (including the Host team)
Central
East
Host
Southeast
Southwest
West 

Pool B (International) consisted of five regions
Asia–Pacific
Canada
Europe–Africa
Latin America
Mexico / Puerto Rico

Champions

Championships won by Country/State

See also
List of Little League World Series champions by division

References

External links
 Little League Baseball official website

 
Sports competitions in South Carolina
Annual sporting events in the United States
Recurring sporting events established in 1968
Recurring sporting events disestablished in 2016